Proditrix megalynta is a species of moth in the family Glyphipterigidae first described by Edward Meyrick in 1915. It is endemic to New Zealand.

References

Moths described in 1915
Moths of New Zealand
Plutellidae
Endemic fauna of New Zealand
Taxa named by Edward Meyrick
Endemic moths of New Zealand